Drama at Ten is a Canadian dramatic anthology television miniseries which aired on CBC Television from 1955 to 1956.

Premise
The series rebroadcast dramas that were previously featured on General Motors Theatre.

Scheduling
This hour-long series was broadcast on Mondays at 10:00 p.m. (Eastern) from 25 July to 8 August 1955, and from 13 to 20 August 1956.

Episodes
 25 July 1955: Roman Gesture (Silvio Narizzano producer; Ira Perry writer)
 1 August 1955: Witch Magic is White? (Martyn Coleman writer; Leslie Duncan adaptation),
 8 August 1955: Deadlier Than the Male (Terry Newman writer)
 13 August 1956: The American
 20 August 1956: Flight into Danger (Arthur Hailey writer)

References

External links
 

CBC Television original programming
1950s Canadian anthology television series
1955 Canadian television series debuts
1956 Canadian television series endings
Black-and-white Canadian television shows